Demann or DeMann is a surname. Notable people with the surname include:

 Freddy DeMann (born 1939), American film producer and music executive
 Kristin Demann (born 1993), German footballer

See also
 Deman (surname)